Thailand, historically known as Siam and officially the Kingdom of Thailand, is a country in Southeast Asia, located at the centre of the Indochinese Peninsula, spanning , with a population of almost 70 million. The country is bordered to the north by Myanmar and Laos, to the east by Laos and Cambodia, to the south by the Gulf of Thailand and Malaysia, and to the west by the Andaman Sea and the extremity of Myanmar. Thailand also shares maritime borders with Vietnam to the southeast, and Indonesia and India to the southwest. Bangkok is the nation's capital and largest city.

Tai peoples migrated from southwestern China to mainland Southeast Asia from the 11th century. Indianised kingdoms such as the Mon, Khmer Empire and Malay states ruled the region, competing with Thai states such as the Kingdoms of Ngoenyang, Sukhothai, Lan Na and Ayutthaya, which also rivalled each other. European contact began in 1511 with a Portuguese diplomatic mission to Ayutthaya, which became a regional power by the end of the 15th century. Ayutthaya reached its peak during the 18th century, until it was destroyed in the Burmese–Siamese War. Taksin quickly reunified the fragmented territory and established the short-lived Thonburi Kingdom. He was succeeded in 1782 by Buddha Yodfa Chulaloke, the first monarch of the current Chakri dynasty. Throughout the era of Western imperialism in Asia, Siam remained the only nation in the region to avoid colonization by foreign powers, although it was often forced to make territorial, trade and legal concessions in unequal treaties. The Siamese system of government was centralised and transformed into a modern unitary absolute monarchy in the reign of Chulalongkorn. In World War I, Siam sided with the Allies, a political decision made in order to amend the unequal treaties. Following a bloodless revolution in 1932, it became a constitutional monarchy and changed its official name to Thailand, becoming an ally of Japan in World War II. In the late 1950s, a military coup under Field Marshal Sarit Thanarat revived the monarchy's historically influential role in politics. Thailand became a major ally of the United States, and played an anti-communist role in the region as a member of the failed SEATO, but from 1975 sought to improve relations with Communist China and Thailand's neighbours.

Apart from a brief period of parliamentary democracy in the mid-1970s, Thailand has periodically alternated between democracy and military rule. Since the 2000s the country has been caught in continual bitter political conflict between supporters and opponents of Thaksin Shinawatra, which resulted in two coups (in 2006 and 2014), along with the establishment of its current constitution, a nominally democratic government after the 2019 Thai general election, and large pro-democracy protests in 2020–2021 which included unprecedented demands to reform the monarchy. Since 2019, it has been nominally a parliamentary constitutional monarchy; in practice, however, structural advantages in the constitution have ensured the military's hold on power.

Thailand is a middle power in global affairs and a founding member of ASEAN, and ranks very high in the Human Development Index. It has the second-largest economy in Southeast Asia and the 22nd-largest in the world by PPP. Thailand is classified as a newly industrialised economy, with manufacturing, agriculture, and tourism as leading sectors.

Etymology 

Thailand, officially the Kingdom of Thailand, was known by outsiders prior to 1939 as Siam. According to George Cœdès, the word Thai means 'free man' in the Thai language, "differentiating the Thai from the natives encompassed in Thai society as serfs". According to Chit Phumisak, Thai simply means 'people' or 'human being', his investigation shows that some rural areas used the word "Thai" instead of the usual Thai word khon for people. According to Michel Ferlus, the ethnonyms Thai-Tai (or Thay-Tay) would have evolved from the etymon *k(ə)ri: 'human being'.

Thais often refer to their country using the polite form prathet Thai. They also use the more colloquial term mueang Thai or simply Thai; the word mueang, archaically referring to a city-state, is commonly used to refer to a city or town as the centre of a region. Ratcha Anachak Thai means 'kingdom of Thailand' or 'kingdom of Thai'. Etymologically, its components are: ratcha (rājan, 'king, royal, realm'); -ana- (Pali āṇā 'authority, command, power', itself from the Sanskrit , ājñā, of the same meaning) -chak (from Sanskrit  cakra- 'wheel', a symbol of power and rule). The Thai National Anthem, written by Luang Saranupraphan during the patriotic 1930s, refers to the Thai nation as prathet Thai. The first line of the national anthem is: prathet thai ruam lueat nuea chat chuea thai, 'Thailand is the unity of Thai flesh and blood'.

The former name Siam may have originated from Sanskrit श्याम (śyāma, 'dark') or Mon ရာမည (rhmañña, 'stranger'). The names Shan and A-hom seem to be variants of the same word. The word Śyâma is possibly not its origin, but a learned and artificial distortion. Another theory is the name derives from the Chinese calling this region 'Xian' A further possibility is that Mon-speaking peoples migrating south called themselves syem as do the autochthonous Mon-Khmer-speaking inhabitants of the Malay Peninsula.

The signature of King Mongkut (r. 1851–1868) reads SPPM (Somdet Phra Poramenthra Maha) Mongkut Rex Siamensium (Mongkut, King of the Siamese). This usage of the name in the country's first international treaty gave the name Siam official status, until 24 June 1939 when it was changed to "Thailand".
Thailand was briefly renamed Siam from 1946 to 1948, after which it again reverted to "Thailand".

History

Prehistory 

There is evidence of continuous human habitation in present-day Thailand from 20,000 years ago to the present day. The earliest evidence of rice growing is dated at 2,000 BCE. Bronze appeared circa 1,250–1,000 BCE. The site of Ban Chiang in northeast Thailand currently ranks as the earliest known centre of copper and bronze production in Southeast Asia. Iron appeared around 500 BCE. The Kingdom of Funan was the first and most powerful Southeast Asian kingdom at the time (2nd century BCE). The Mon people established the principalities of Dvaravati and Kingdom of Hariphunchai in the 6th century. The Khmer people established the Khmer empire, centred in Angkor, in the 9th century. Tambralinga, a Malay state controlling trade through the Malacca Strait, rose in the 10th century. The Indochina peninsula was heavily influenced by the culture and religions of India from the time of the Kingdom of Funan to that of the Khmer Empire.

The Thai people are of the Tai ethnic group, characterised by common linguistic roots. Chinese chronicles first mention the Tai peoples in the 6th century BCE. While there are many assumptions regarding the origin of Tai peoples, David K. Wyatt, a historian of Thailand, argued that their ancestors which at the present inhabit Laos, Thailand, Myanmar, India, and China came from the Điện Biên Phủ area between the 5th and the 8th century. Thai people began migrating into present-day Thailand around the 11th century, which Mon and Khmer people occupied at the time. Thus Thai culture was influenced by Indian, Mon, and Khmer cultures.

According to French historian George Cœdès, "The Thai first enter history of Farther India in the eleventh century with the mention of Syam slaves or prisoners of war in Champa epigraphy", and "in the twelfth century, the bas-reliefs of Angkor Wat" where "a group of warriors" are described as Syam.

Early states and Sukhothai Kingdom 

After the decline of the Khmer Empire and Kingdom of Pagan in the early-13th century, various states thrived in their place. The domains of Tai people existed from the northeast of present-day India to the north of present-day Laos and to the Malay peninsula. During the 13th century, Tai people had already settled in the core land of Dvaravati and Lavo Kingdom to Nakhon Si Thammarat in the south. There are, however, no records detailing the arrival of the Tais.

Around 1240, Pho Khun Bang Klang Hao, a local Tai ruler, rallied the people to rebel against the Khmer. He later crowned himself the first king of Sukhothai Kingdom in 1238. Mainstream Thai historians count Sukhothai as the first kingdom of Thai people. Sukhothai expanded furthest during the reign of Ram Khamhaeng (r. 1279–1298). However, it was mostly a network of local lords who swore fealty to Sukhothai, not directly controlled by it. He is believed have invented Thai script and Thai ceramics were an important export in his era. Sukhothai embraced Theravada Buddhism in the reign of Maha Thammaracha I (1347–1368).

To the north, Mangrai, who descended from a local ruler lineage of Ngoenyang, founded the kingdom of Lan Na in 1292, centered in Chiang Mai. He unified the surrounding area and his dynasty would rule the kingdom continuously for the next two centuries. He also created a network of states through political alliances to the east and north of the Mekong. While in the port in Lower Chao Phraya Basin, a federation around Phetchaburi, Suphan Buri, Lopburi, and the Ayutthaya area was created in the 11th century.

Ayutthaya Kingdom 

According to the most widely accepted version of its origin, the Ayutthaya Kingdom rose from the earlier, nearby Lavo Kingdom and Suvarnabhumi with Uthong as its first king. Ayutthaya was a patchwork of self-governing principalities and tributary provinces owing allegiance to the King of Ayutthaya under the mandala system. Its initial expansion was through conquest and political marriage. Before the end of the 15th century, Ayutthaya invaded the Khmer Empire three times and sacked its capital Angkor. Ayutthaya then became a regional power in place of the Khmer. Constant interference of Sukhothai effectively made it a vassal state of Ayutthaya and it was finally incorporated into the kingdom. Borommatrailokkanat brought about bureaucratic reforms which lasted into the 20th century and created a system of social hierarchy called sakdina, where male commoners were conscripted as corvée labourers for six months a year. Ayutthaya was interested in the Malay peninsula, but failed to conquer the Malacca Sultanate which was supported by the Chinese Ming dynasty.

European contact and trade started in the early-16th century, with the envoy of Portuguese duke Afonso de Albuquerque in 1511.  Portugal became an ally and ceded some soldiers to King Rama Thibodi II. The Portuguese were followed in the 17th century by the French, Dutch, and English. Rivalry for supremacy over Chiang Mai and the Mon people pitted Ayutthaya against the Burmese Kingdom. Several wars with its ruling Taungoo dynasty starting in the 1540s in the reign of Tabinshwehti and Bayinnaung were ultimately ended with the capture of the capital in 1570. Then was a brief period of vassalage to Burma until Naresuan proclaimed independence in 1584.

Ayutthaya then sought to improve relations with European powers for many successive reigns. The kingdom especially prospered during cosmopolitan Narai's reign (1656–1688) when some European travelers regarded Ayutthaya as an Asian great power, alongside China and India. However, growing French influence later in his reign was met with nationalist sentiment and led eventually to the Siamese revolution of 1688. However, overall relations remained stable, with French missionaries still active in preaching Christianity.

After a bloody period of dynastic struggle, Ayutthaya entered into what has been called the Siamese "golden age", a relatively peaceful episode in the second quarter of the 18th century when art, literature, and learning flourished. There were seldom foreign wars, apart from conflict with the Nguyễn Lords for control of Cambodia starting around 1715. The last fifty years of the kingdom witnessed bloody succession crises, where there were purges of court officials and able generals for many consecutive reigns. In 1765, a combined 40,000-strong force of Burmese armies invaded it from the north and west. The Burmese under the new Alaungpaya dynasty quickly rose to become a new local power by 1759. After a 14-month siege, the capital city's walls fell and the city was burned in April 1767.

Thonburi Kingdom 

The capital and many of its territories lay in chaos after the war. The former capital was occupied by the Burmese garrison army and five local leaders declared themselves overlords, including the lords of Sakwangburi, Phitsanulok, Pimai, Chanthaburi, and Nakhon Si Thammarat. Chao Tak, a capable military leader, proceeded to make himself a lord by right of conquest, beginning with the legendary sack of Chanthaburi. Based at Chanthaburi, Chao Tak raised troops and resources, and sent a fleet up the Chao Phraya to take the fort of Thonburi. In the same year, Chao Tak was able to retake Ayutthaya from the Burmese only seven months after the fall of the city.

Chao Tak then crowned himself as Taksin and proclaimed Thonburi as temporary capital in the same year. He also quickly subdued the other warlords. His forces engaged in wars with Burma, Laos, and Cambodia, which successfully drove the Burmese out of Lan Na in 1775, captured Vientiane in 1778 and tried to install a pro-Thai king in Cambodia in the 1770s. In his final years there was a coup, caused supposedly by his "insanity", and eventually Taksin and his sons were executed by his longtime companion General Chao Phraya Chakri (the future Rama I). He was the first king of the ruling Chakri dynasty and founder of the Rattanakosin Kingdom on 6 April 1782.

Modernisation and centralisation 

Under Rama I (1782–1809), Rattanakosin successfully defended against Burmese attacks and put an end to Burmese incursions. He also created suzerainty over large portions of Laos and Cambodia. In 1821, Briton John Crawfurd was sent to negotiate a new trade agreement with Siam – the first sign of an issue which was to dominate 19th century Siamese politics. Bangkok signed the Burney Treaty in 1826, after the British victory in the First Anglo-Burmese War. Anouvong of Vientiane, who mistakenly held the belief that Britain was about to launch an invasion of Bangkok, started the Lao rebellion in 1826 which was suppressed. Vientiane was destroyed and a large number of Lao people were relocated to Khorat Plateau as a result. Bangkok also waged several wars with Vietnam, where Siam successfully regained hegemony over Cambodia.

From the late-19th century, Siam tried to rule the ethnic groups in the realm as colonies. In the reign of Mongkut (1851–1868), who recognised the potential threat Western powers posed to Siam, his court contacted the British government directly to defuse tensions. A British mission led by Sir John Bowring, Governor of Hong Kong, led to the signing of the Bowring Treaty, the first of many unequal treaties with Western countries. This, however, brought trade and economic development to Siam. The unexpected death of Mongkut from malaria led to the reign of underage Prince Chulalongkorn, with Somdet Chaophraya Sri Suriwongse (Chuang Bunnag) acting as regent.

Chulalongkorn (r. 1868–1910) initiated centralisation, set up a privy council, and abolished slavery and the corvée system. The Front Palace crisis of 1874 stalled attempts at further reforms. In the 1870s and 1880s, he incorporated the protectorates up north into the kingdom proper, which later expanded to the protectorates in the northeast and the south. He established twelve krom in 1888, which were equivalent to present-day ministries. The crisis of 1893 erupted, caused by French demands for Laotian territory east of Mekong. Thailand is the only Southeast Asian nation never to have been colonised by a Western power, in part because Britain and France agreed in 1896 to make the Chao Phraya valley a buffer state. Not until the 20th century could Siam renegotiate every unequal treaty dating from the Bowring Treaty, including extraterritoriality. The advent of the monthon system marked the creation of the modern Thai nation-state. In 1905, there were unsuccessful rebellions in the ancient Patani area, Ubon Ratchathani, and Phrae in opposition to an attempt to blunt the power of local lords.

The Palace Revolt of 1912 was a failed attempt by Western-educated military officers to overthrow the Siamese monarchy. Vajiravudh (r. 1910–1925) responded by propaganda for the entirety of his reign, which promoted the idea of the Thai nation. In 1917, Siam joined the First World War on the side of the Allies. In the aftermath Siam had a seat at the Paris Peace Conference, and gained freedom of taxation and the revocation of extraterritoriality.

Constitutional monarchy, World War II and Cold War 

A bloodless revolution took place in 1932, in which Prajadhipok was forced to grant the country's first constitution, thereby ending centuries of feudal and absolute monarchy. The combined results of economic hardships brought on by the Great Depression, sharply falling rice prices, and a significant reduction in public spending caused discontent among aristocrats. In 1933, a counter-revolutionary rebellion occurred which aimed to reinstate absolute monarchy, but failed. Prajadhipok's conflict with the government eventually led to abdication. The government selected Ananda Mahidol, who was studying in Switzerland, to be the new king.

Later that decade, the army wing of Khana Ratsadon came to dominate Siamese politics. Plaek Phibunsongkhram who became premier in 1938, started political oppression and took an openly anti-royalist stance. His government adopted nationalism and Westernisation, anti-Chinese and anti-French policies.

In 1939, there was a decree changing the name of the country from "Siam" to "Thailand". In 1941, Thailand was in a brief conflict with Vichy France resulting in Thailand gaining some Lao and Cambodian territories.

On 8 December 1941, the Empire of Japan launched an invasion of Thailand, and fighting broke out shortly before Phibun ordered an armistice. Japan was granted free passage, and on 21 December Thailand and Japan signed a military alliance with a secret protocol, wherein the Japanese government agreed to help Thailand regain lost territories. The Thai government declared war on the United States and the United Kingdom. The Free Thai Movement was launched both in Thailand and abroad to oppose the government and Japanese occupation. After the war ended in 1945, Thailand signed formal agreements to end the state of war with the Allies. The main Allied powers had ignored Thailand's declaration of war.

In June 1946, young King Ananda was found dead under mysterious circumstances. His younger brother Bhumibol Adulyadej ascended to the throne. Thailand joined the Southeast Asia Treaty Organization (SEATO) to become an active ally of the United States in 1954. Field Marshal Sarit Thanarat launched a coup in 1957, which removed Khana Ratsadon from politics. His rule (premiership 1959–1963) was autocratic; he built his legitimacy around the god-like status of the monarch and by channelling the government's loyalty to the king. His government improved the country's infrastructure and education. After the United States joined the Vietnam War in 1961, there was a secret agreement wherein the U.S. promised to protect Thailand.

The period brought about increasing modernisation and Westernisation of Thai society. Rapid urbanisation occurred when the rural populace sought work in growing cities. Rural farmers gained class consciousness and were sympathetic to the Communist Party of Thailand. Economic development and education enabled the rise of a middle class in Bangkok and other cities. In October 1971, there was a large demonstration against the dictatorship of Thanom Kittikachorn (premiership 1963–1973), which led to civilian casualties. Bhumibol installed Sanya Dharmasakti (premiership 1973–1975) to replace him, marking the first time that the king had intervened in Thai politics directly since 1932. The aftermath of the event marked a short-lived parliamentary democracy, often called the "era when democracy blossomed" (ยุคประชาธิปไตยเบ่งบาน).

Contemporary history 

Constant unrest and instability, as well as fear of a communist takeover after the fall of Saigon, made some ultra-right groups brand leftist students as communists. This culminated in the Thammasat University massacre in October 1976. A coup d'état on that day brought Thailand a new ultra-right government, which cracked down on media outlets, officials, and intellectuals, and fuelled the communist insurgency. Another coup the following year installed a more moderate government, which offered amnesty to communist fighters in 1978.

Fuelled by Indochina refugee crisis, Vietnamese border raids and economic hardships, Prem Tinsulanonda became the Prime Minister from 1980 to 1988. The communists abandoned the insurgency by 1983. Prem's premiership was dubbed "semi-democracy" because the Parliament was composed of all elected House and all appointed Senate. The 1980s also saw increasing intervention in politics by the monarch, who rendered two coups in 1981 and 1985 attempts against Prem failed. Thailand had its first elected prime minister in 1988.

Suchinda Kraprayoon, who was the coup leader in 1991 and said he would not seek to become prime minister, was nominated as one by the majority coalition government after the 1992 general election. This caused a popular demonstration in Bangkok, which ended with a bloody military crackdown. Bhumibol intervened in the event and signed an amnesty law, Suchinda then resigned.

The 1997 Asian financial crisis originated in Thailand and ended the country's 40 years of uninterrupted economic growth. Chuan Leekpai's government took an IMF loan with unpopular provisions. The populist Thai Rak Thai party, led by prime minister Thaksin Shinawatra, governed from 2001 until 2006. His policies were successful in reducing rural poverty and initiated universal healthcare in the country. A South Thailand insurgency escalated starting from 2004. The 2004 Indian Ocean earthquake and tsunami hit the country, mostly in the south. Massive protests against Thaksin led by the People's Alliance for Democracy (PAD) started in his second term as prime minister and his tenure ended with a coup d'état in 2006. The junta installed a military government which lasted a year.

In 2007, a civilian government led by the Thaksin-allied People's Power Party (PPP) was elected. Another protest led by PAD ended with the dissolution of PPP, and the Democrat Party led a coalition government in its place. The pro-Thaksin United Front for Democracy Against Dictatorship (UDD) protested both in 2009 and in 2010, the latter of which ended with a violent military crackdown causing more than 70 civilian deaths.

After the general election of 2011, the populist Pheu Thai Party won a majority and Yingluck Shinawatra, Thaksin's younger sister, became prime minister. The People's Democratic Reform Committee organised another anti-Shinawatra protest after the ruling party proposed an amnesty bill which would benefit Thaksin. Yingluck dissolved parliament and a general election was scheduled, but was invalidated by the Constitutional Court. The crisis ended with another coup d'état in 2014.

The ensuing National Council for Peace and Order, a military junta led by General Prayut Chan-o-cha, led the country until 2019. Civil and political rights were restricted, and the country saw a surge in lèse-majesté cases. Political opponents and dissenters were sent to "attitude adjustment" camps; this was described by academics as showing the rise of fascism. Bhumibol, the longest-reigning Thai king, died in 2016, and his son Vajiralongkorn ascended to the throne. The referendum and adoption of Thailand's current constitution happened under the junta's rule. The junta also bound future governments to a 20-year national strategy 'road map' it laid down, effectively locking the country into military-guided democracy. In 2019, the junta agreed to schedule a general election in March. Prayut continued his premiership with the support of Palang Pracharath Party-coalition in the House and junta-appointed Senate, amid allegations of election fraud. The 2020–21 pro-democracy protests were triggered by increasing royal prerogative, democratic and economic regression from the Royal Thai Armed Forces supported by the Thai monarchy in the wake of the 2014 Thai coup d'état, dissolution of the pro-democracy Future Forward Party, distrust in the 2019 general election and the current political system, forced disappearance and deaths of political activists including Wanchalearm Satsaksit, and political corruption scandals, which brought forward unprecedented demands to reform the monarchy and the highest sense of republicanism in the country.

Geography 

Totalling , Thailand is the 50th-largest country by total area. It is slightly smaller than Yemen and slightly larger than Spain.

Thailand comprises several distinct geographic regions, partly corresponding to the provincial groups. The northeast, Isan, consists of the Khorat Plateau, bordered to the east by the Mekong River. The centre of the country is dominated by the predominantly flat Chao Phraya river valley, which runs into the Gulf of Thailand.

Southern Thailand consists of the narrow Kra Isthmus that widens into the Malay Peninsula. Politically, there are six geographical regions which differ from the others in population, basic resources, natural features, and level of social and economic development. The diversity of the regions is the most pronounced attribute of Thailand's physical setting.

The Chao Phraya and the Mekong River are the indispensable water courses of rural Thailand. Industrial scale production of crops use both rivers and their tributaries. It contributes to the tourism sector owing to its clear shallow waters along the coasts in the southern region and the Kra Isthmus. The eastern shore of the Gulf of Thailand is an industrial centre of Thailand with the kingdom's premier deepwater port in Sattahip and its busiest commercial port, Laem Chabang.

The Andaman Sea is a precious natural resource as it hosts popular and luxurious resorts. Phuket, Krabi, Ranong, Phang Nga and Trang, and their islands, all lay along the coasts of the Andaman Sea and, despite the 2004 tsunami, they remain a tourist magnet.

Climate 

Thailand's climate is influenced by monsoon winds that have a seasonal character (the southwest and northeast monsoon). Most of the country is classified as Köppen's tropical savanna climate. The majority of the south as well as the eastern tip of the east have a tropical monsoon climate. Parts of the south also have a tropical rainforest climate.

A year in Thailand is divided into three seasons. The first is the rainy or southwest monsoon season (mid–May to mid–October), which is caused by southwestern wind from the Indian Ocean. Rainfall is also contributed by Intertropical Convergence Zone (ITCZ) and tropical cyclones, with August and September being the wettest period of the year. Winter or the northeast monsoon occurs from mid–October until mid–February. Most of Thailand experiences dry weather with mild temperatures. Summer or the pre–monsoon season runs from mid–February until mid–May. Due to their inland position and latitude, the north, northeast, central and eastern parts of Thailand experience a long period of warm weather, where temperatures can reach up to  during March to May, in contrast to close to or below  in some areas in winter. Southern Thailand is characterised by mild weather year-round with less diurnal and seasonal variations in temperatures due to maritime influences. It receives abundant rainfall, particularly during October to November.

Thailand is among the world's ten countries that are most exposed to climate change. In particular, it is highly vulnerable to rising sea levels and extreme weather events.

Biodiversity and conservation 

National parks in Thailand are defined as an area that contains natural resources of ecological importance or unique beauty, or flora and fauna of special importance. Thailand's protected areas include 156 national parks, 58 wildlife sanctuaries, 67 non-hunting areas, and 120 forest parks. They cover almost 31 percent of the kingdom's territory.

The parks are administered by the National Parks, Wildlife and Plant Conservation Department (DNP), of the Ministry of Natural Resources and Environment (MNRE).

Thailand has a mediocre but improving performance in the global Environmental Performance Index (EPI) with an overall ranking of 91 out of 180 countries in 2016. The environmental areas where Thailand performs worst (i.e., highest-ranking) are air quality (167), environmental effects of the agricultural industry (106), and the climate and energy sector (93), the later mainly because of a high CO2 emission per KWh produced. Thailand performs best (i.e., lowest-ranking) in water resource management (66), with some major improvements expected for the future, and sanitation (68). The country had a 2019 Forest Landscape Integrity Index mean score of 6.00/10, ranking it 88th globally out of 172 countries.

The population of elephants, the country's national symbol, has fallen from 100,000 in 1850 to an estimated 2,000. Poachers have long hunted elephants for ivory and hides, and now increasingly for meat. Young elephants are often captured for use in tourist attractions or as work animals, where there have been claims of mistreatment. However, their use has declined since the government banned logging in 1989.

Poaching of protected species remains a major problem. Tigers, leopards, and other large cats are hunted for their pelts. Many are farmed or hunted for their meat, which supposedly has medicinal properties. Although such trade is illegal, the well-known Bangkok market Chatuchak is still known for the sale of endangered species. The practice of keeping wild animals as pets affects species such as Asiatic black bear, Malayan sun bear, white-handed lar, pileated gibbon, and binturong.

Politics 

Prior to 1932, Thai kings were feudal or absolute monarchs. During Sukhothai Kingdom, the king was seen as a Dharmaraja or 'king who rules in accordance with Dharma'. The system of government was a network of tributaries ruled by local lords. Modern absolute monarchy and statehood was established by Chulalongkorn when he transformed the decentralized protectorate system into a unitary state. On 24 June 1932, Khana Ratsadon (People's Party) carried out a bloodless revolution which marked the beginning of constitutional monarchy.

Thailand has had 20 constitutions and charters since 1932, including the latest and current 2017 Constitution. All constitutions state that the politics is conducted within the framework of a constitutional monarchy, but the de facto form of government has ranged from military dictatorship to electoral democracy. Thailand has had the fourth-most coups in the world. "Uniformed or ex-military men have led Thailand for 55 of the 83 years" between 1932 and 2009. Most recently, the military junta self-titled as the National Council for Peace and Order ruled the country between 2014 and 2019. Since the 2019 Thai general election, Thailand's nominally democratic government has been led by Prayut Chan-o-cha, a royalist who was the former commander-in-chief of the Royal Thai Army that initiated the 2014 Thai coup d'état. Following the Constitutional Court's decision on 24 August 2022 to temporarily suspend Prayut Chan-o-cha's premiership until September to determine whether or not he has reached his 8-year term limit, Prawit Wongsuwan assumed the role of acting Prime Minister. Thailand's current form of government is part democracy and part dictatorship; many terms are used in an attempt to describe it.

A hereditary monarch serves as Thailand's head of state. The current King of Thailand is Vajiralongkorn (or Rama X), who has reigned since October 2016. The powers of the king are limited by the constitution and he is primarily a symbolic figurehead. However, the monarch still occasionally intervenes in Thai politics, as all constitutions pave the way for customary royal rulings. Some academics outside Thailand, including Duncan McCargo and Federico Ferrara, noted extraconstitutional role of the monarch through a "network monarchy" behind the political scenes. The monarchy is protected by the severe lèse majesté law, even though the people's attitude towards the institution varies from one reign to another.

Government is separated into three branches:
 The legislative branch: the National Assembly is composed of the Senate, the 250-member fully appointed upper house, and House of Representatives, the elected 500-member lower house. The current constitution gives senators power to elect prime ministers along with the representatives until 2022. Its most recent election is the 2019 general election. The coalition led by Palang Pracharath Party currently holds the majority.
 The executive branch consisting of the Prime Minister of Thailand who was elected by the National Assembly and other cabinet members of up to 35 people. The cabinet was appointed by the king on the advice of the prime minister. The prime minister is the head of government.
 The judiciary is supposed to be independent of the executive and the legislative branches, although judicial rulings are suspected of being based on political considerations rather than on existing law.

Military and bureaucratic aristocrats fully controlled political parties between 1946 and the 1980s. Most parties in Thailand are short-lived. Between 1992 and 2006, Thailand had a two-party system. Since 2000, two political parties dominated Thai general elections: one was the Pheu Thai Party (which was a successor of People's Power Party and the Thai Rak Thai Party), and the other was the Democrat Party. The political parties which support Thaksin Shinawatra won the most representatives every general election since 2001. Later constitutions created a multi-party system where a single party cannot gain a majority in the house.

The kings are protected by lèse-majesté laws which allow critics to be jailed for three to fifteen years. After the 2014 Thai coup d'état, Thailand had the highest number of lèse-majesté prisoners in the nation's history. In 2017, the military court in Thailand sentenced a man to 35 years in prison for violating the country's lèse-majesté law. Human rights in Thailand has been rated not free on the Freedom House Index since 2014.

Administrative divisions 

Thailand is a unitary state; the administrative services of the executive branch are divided into three levels by National Government Organisation Act, BE 2534 (1991): central, provincial and local. Thailand is composed of 76 provinces (changwat), which are first-level administrative divisions. There are also two specially governed districts: the capital Bangkok and Pattaya. Bangkok is at provincial level and thus often counted as a province. Each province is divided into districts (amphoe) and the districts are further divided into sub-districts (tambons). The name of each province's capital city (mueang) is the same as that of the province. For example, the capital of Chiang Mai Province (Changwat Chiang Mai) is Mueang Chiang Mai or Chiang Mai. All provincial governors and district chiefs, which are administrators of provinces and districts respectively, are appointed by the central government. Thailand's provinces are sometimes grouped into four to six regions, depending on the source.

Foreign relations 

Siam's and Thailand's way of conducting foreign relations has long been described as "bamboo bending with the wind", which means adaptable and pragmatic. In order to secure independence, it sought to pit one great power against the others so that it would be dominated by none. Siam and Thailand is also known for making concessions, such as signing unequal treaties since the Bowring Treaty and giving up its protectorates in Malaya, Laos and Cambodia to this end. In some occasions Siam and Thailand could drop neutrality and took a side in conflicts for its benefits, such as joining the Allies in World War I and Japan in World War II.

During the Cold War, Thailand sought to prevent the spread of communism so it joined the United States, including participating in SEATO alliance, sending expeditions to Korea and Vietnam, and offering the US to use its base. Thailand is one of the five founding members of Association of Southeast Asian Nations (ASEAN), initially to safeguard against communism. The end of Vietnam War was a turning point in Thai foreign policy and afterwards it sought to improve relations with Communist China and its now-Communist neighbours. Thailand remains an active member of ASEAN and seek to project its influence in it. Thailand has developed increasingly close ties with other members, with progressing regional co-operation in economic, trade, banking, political, and cultural matters.

In 2000s period, Thailand had taken an active role on the international stage and participated fully in international and regional organisations. It is a major non-NATO ally and Priority Watch List Special 301 Report of the United States. When East Timor gained independence from Indonesia, Thailand contributed troops to the international peacekeeping effort. As part of its effort to increase international ties, Thailand had reached out to such regional organisations as the Organization of American States (OAS) and the Organization for Security and Co-operation in Europe (OSCE).

During Thaksin Shinawatra's premiership, negotiations for several free trade agreements with China, Australia, Bahrain, India, and the US were initiated. Thaksin sought to position Thailand as a regional leader, initiating various development projects in poorer neighbouring countries. More controversially, he established close, friendly ties with the Burmese dictatorship. Thailand joined the US-led invasion of Iraq, sending a humanitarian contingent until September 2004. Thailand also had contributed troops to reconstruction efforts in Afghanistan.

In April 2009, the Cambodian–Thai border dispute brought troops on territory immediately adjacent to the 900-year-old ruins of Cambodia's Preah Vihear Hindu temple near the border.

After the 2014 coup, Thailand leaned more towards China. Growing Chinese influence and capital inflow caused some members of parliament to raise the concern about "economic colony" under China after many concessions.

Armed forces 

The Royal Thai Armed Forces (กองทัพไทย) constitute the military of the Kingdom of Thailand. It consists of the Royal Thai Army (กองทัพบกไทย), the Royal Thai Navy (กองทัพเรือไทย), and the Royal Thai Air Force (กองทัพอากาศไทย). It also incorporates various paramilitary forces.

The Thai Armed Forces have a combined manpower of 306,000 active duty personnel and another 245,000 active reserve personnel. The head of the Thai Armed Forces (จอมทัพไทย, Chom Thap Thai) is the king, although this position is only nominal. The armed forces are managed by the Ministry of Defence of Thailand, which is headed by the Minister of Defence (a member of the cabinet of Thailand) and commanded by the Royal Thai Armed Forces Headquarters, which in turn is headed by the Chief of Defence Forces of Thailand. Thai annual defense budget almost tripled from 78 billion baht in 2005 to 207 billion baht in 2016, accounting for approximately 1.5% of 2019 Thai GDP. Thailand ranked 16th worldwide in the Military Strength Index based on the Credit Suisse report in September 2015.

The military is also tasked with humanitarian missions, such as escorting Rohingya to Malaysia or Indonesia, ensuring security and welfare for refugees during Indochina refugee crisis.

According to the constitution, serving in the armed forces is a duty of all Thai citizens. Thailand still use active draft system for males over the age of 21. They are subjected to varying lengths of active service depending on the duration of reserve training as Territorial Defence Student and their level of education. Those who have completed three years or more of reserve training will be exempted entirely. The practice has long been criticized, as some media question its efficacy and value. It is alleged that conscripts end up as servants to senior officers or clerks in military cooperative shops. In a report issued in March 2020, Amnesty International charged that Thai military conscripts face institutionalised abuse systematically hushed up by military authorities.

Critics observed that Thai military's main objective is to deal with internal rather than external threats. Internal Security Operations Command is called the political arm of the Thai military, which has overlapping social and political functions with civilian bureaucracy. It also has anti-democracy mission. The military is also notorious for numerous corruption incidents, such as accusation of human trafficking, and nepotism in promotion of high-ranking officers. The military is deeply entrenched in politics. Most recently, the appointed senators include more than 100 active and retired military.

In 2017, Thailand signed and ratified the UN Treaty on the Prohibition of Nuclear Weapons.

Economy 

The economy of Thailand is heavily export-dependent, with exports accounting for more than two-thirds of gross domestic product (GDP). Thailand exports over US$105 billion worth of goods and services annually. Major exports include cars, computers, electrical appliances, rice, textiles and footwear, fishery products, rubber, and jewellery.

Thailand is an emerging economy and is considered a newly industrialised country. Thailand had a 2017 GDP of US$1.236 trillion (on a purchasing power parity basis). Thailand is the second largest economy in Southeast Asia after Indonesia. Thailand ranks midway in the wealth spread in Southeast Asia as it is the fourth richest nation according to GDP per capita, after Singapore, Brunei, and Malaysia.

Thailand functions as an anchor economy for the neighbouring developing economies of Laos, Myanmar, and Cambodia. In the third quarter of 2014, the unemployment rate in Thailand stood at 0.84% according to Thailand's National Economic and Social Development Board (NESDB).

Recent economic history 

Thailand experienced the world's highest economic growth rate from 1985 to 1996 – averaging 12.4% annually. In 1997 increased pressure on the baht, a year in which the economy contracted by 1.9%, led to a crisis that uncovered financial sector weaknesses and forced the Chavalit Yongchaiyudh administration to float the currency. Prime Minister Chavalit Yongchaiyudh was forced to resign after his cabinet came under fire for its slow response to the economic crisis. The baht was pegged at 25 to the US dollar from 1978 to 1997. The baht reached its lowest point of 56 to the US dollar in January 1998 and the economy contracted by 10.8% that year, triggering the Asian financial crisis.

Thailand's economy started to recover in 1999, expanding 4.2–4.4% in 2000, thanks largely to strong exports. Growth (2.2%) was dampened by the softening of the global economy in 2001, but picked up in the subsequent years owing to strong growth in Asia, a relatively weak baht encouraging exports, and increased domestic spending as a result of several mega projects and incentives of Prime Minister Thaksin Shinawatra, known as Thaksinomics. Growth in 2002, 2003, and 2004 was 5–7% annually.

Growth in 2005, 2006, and 2007 hovered around 4–5%. Due both to the weakening of the US dollar and an increasingly strong Thai currency, by March 2008 the dollar was hovering around the 33 baht mark. While Thaksinomics has received criticism, official economic data reveals that between 2001 and 2011, Isan's GDP per capita more than doubled to US$1,475, while, over the same period, GDP in the Bangkok area increased from US$7,900 to nearly US$13,000.

With the instability surrounding major 2010 protests, the GDP growth of Thailand settled at around 4–5%, from highs of 5–7% under the previous civilian administration. Political uncertainty was identified as the primary cause of a decline in investor and consumer confidence. The IMF predicted that the Thai economy would rebound strongly from the low 0.1% GDP growth in 2011, to 5.5% in 2012 and then 7.5% in 2013, due to the monetary policy of the Bank of Thailand, as well as a package of fiscal stimulus measures introduced by the former Yingluck Shinawatra government.

Following the Thai military coup of 22 May 2014. In 2017, Concluded with information on the Thai economy's grew an inflation-adjusted 3.9%, up from 3.3% in 2016, marking its fastest expansion since 2012.

Income, poverty and wealth 

Thais have median wealth per one adult person of $1,469 in 2016, increasing from $605 in 2010. In 2016, Thailand was ranked 87th in Human Development Index, and 70th in the inequality-adjusted HDI.

In 2017, Thailand's median household income was ฿26,946 per month. Top quintile households had a 45.0% share of all income, while bottom quintile households had 7.1%. There were 26.9 million persons who had the bottom 40% of income earning less than ฿5,344 per person per month. During the 2013–2014 Thai political crisis, a survey found that anti-government PDRC mostly (32%) had a monthly income of more than ฿50,000, while pro-government UDD mostly (27%) had between ฿10,000 and ฿20,000.

In 2014, Credit Suisse reported that Thailand was the world's third most unequal country, behind Russia and India. The top 10% richest held 79% of the country's assets. The top 1% richest held 58% of the assets. The 50 richest Thai families had a total net worth accounting to 30% of GDP.

In 2016, 5.81 million people lived in poverty, or 11.6 million people (17.2% of population) if "near poor" is included. The proportion of the poor relative to total population in each region was 12.96% in the Northeast, 12.35% in the South, and 9.83% in the North. In 2017, there were 14 million people who applied for social welfare (yearly income of less than ฿100,000 was required). At the end of 2017, Thailand's total household debt was ฿11.76 trillion. In 2010, 3% of all household were bankrupt. In 2016, there were estimated 30,000 homeless persons in the country.

Exports and manufacturing 

The economy of Thailand is heavily export-dependent, with exports accounting for more than two-thirds of gross domestic product (GDP). Thailand exports over US$105 billion worth of goods and services annually. Major exports include cars, computers, electrical appliances, rice, textiles and footwear, fishery products, rubber, and jewellery.

Substantial industries include electric appliances, components, computer components, and vehicles. Thailand's recovery from the 1997–1998 Asian financial crisis depended mainly on exports, among various other factors. , the Thai automotive industry was the largest in Southeast Asia and the 9th largest in the world. The Thailand industry has an annual output of near 1.5 million vehicles, mostly commercial vehicles.

Most of the vehicles built in Thailand are developed and licensed by foreign producers, mainly Japanese and American. The Thai car industry takes advantage of the ASEAN Free Trade Area (AFTA) to find a market for many of its products. Eight manufacturers, five Japanese, two US, and Tata of India, produce pick-up trucks in Thailand. As of 2012, due to its favorable taxation for 2-door pick-ups at only 3–12% against 17–50% for passenger cars, Thailand was the second largest consumer of pick-up trucks in the world, after the US. In 2014, pick-ups accounted for 42% of all new vehicle sales in Thailand.

Tourism 

Tourism makes up about 6% of the country's economy. Prior to the pandemic, Thailand was world’s eighth most visited country as per World Tourism rankings compiled by the United Nations World Tourism Organization. In 2019, Thailand received 39.8 million international tourists, ahead of United Kingdom and Germany and received fourth highest international tourism earning at 60.5 billion US dollar. 

Thailand was the most visited country in Southeast Asia in 2013, according to the World Tourism Organisation. Estimates of tourism receipts directly contributing to the Thai GDP of 12 trillion baht range from 9 percent (1 trillion baht) (2013) to 16 percent. When including the indirect effects of tourism, it is said to account for 20.2 percent (2.4 trillion baht) of Thailand's GDP.

Asian tourists primarily visit Thailand for Bangkok and the historical, natural, and cultural sights in its vicinity. Western tourists not only visit Bangkok and surroundings, but in addition many travel to the southern beaches and islands. The north is the chief destination for trekking and adventure travel with its diverse ethnic minority groups and forested mountains. The region hosting the fewest tourists is Isan. To accommodate foreign visitors, a separate tourism police with offices were set up in the major tourist areas and an emergency telephone number.

Thailand ranks fifth biggest medical tourism destination of inbound medical tourism spending, according to World Travel and Tourism Council, attracting over 2.5 million visitors in 2018. The country is also Asia's number one. The country is popular for the growing practice of sex reassignment surgery (SRS) and cosmetic surgery. In 2010–2012, more than 90% of medical tourists travelled to Thailand for SRS.

Prostitution in Thailand and sex tourism also form a de facto part of the economy. Campaigns promote Thailand as exotic to attract tourists. One estimate published in 2003 placed the trade at US$4.3 billion per year or about 3% of the Thai economy. It is believed that at least 10% of tourist dollars are spent on the sex trade.

Agriculture and natural resources 

Forty-nine per cent of Thailand's labour force is employed in agriculture. This is down from 70% in 1980. Rice is the most important crop in the country and Thailand had long been the world's leading exporter of rice, until recently falling behind both India and Vietnam. Thailand has the highest percentage of arable land, 27.25%, of any nation in the Greater Mekong Subregion. About 55% of the arable land area is used for rice production.

Agriculture has been experiencing a transition from labour-intensive and transitional methods to a more industrialised and competitive sector. Between 1962 and 1983, the agricultural sector grew by 4.1% per year on average and continued to grow at 2.2% between 1983 and 2007. The relative contribution of agriculture to GDP has declined while exports of goods and services have increased.

Furthermore, access to biocapacity in Thailand is lower than world average. In 2016, Thailand had 1.2 global hectares of biocapacity per person within its territory, a little less than world average of 1.6 global hectares per person. In contrast, in 2016, they used 2.5 global hectares of biocapacity – their ecological footprint of consumption. This means they use about twice as much biocapacity as Thailand contains. As a result, Thailand is running a biocapacity deficit.

Informal economy 
Thailand has a diverse and robust informal labour sector—in 2012, it was estimated that informal workers comprised 62.6% of the Thai workforce. The Ministry of Labour defines informal workers to be individuals who work in informal economies and do not have employee status under a given country's Labour Protection Act (LPA). The informal sector in Thailand has grown significantly over the past 60 years over the course of Thailand's gradual transition from an agriculture-based economy to becoming more industrialised and service-oriented. Between 1993 and 1995, ten percent of the Thai labour force moved from the agricultural sector to urban and industrial jobs, especially in the manufacturing sector. It is estimated that between 1988 and 1995, the number of factory workers in the country doubled from two to four million, as Thailand's GDP tripled. While the Asian Financial Crisis that followed in 1997 hit the Thai economy hard, the industrial sector continued to expand under widespread deregulation, as Thailand was mandated to adopt a range of structural adjustment reforms upon receiving funding from the IMF and World Bank. These reforms implemented an agenda of increased privatisation and trade liberalisation in the country, and decreased federal subsidisation of public goods and utilities, agricultural price supports, and regulations on fair wages and labour conditions. These changes put further pressure on the agricultural sector, and prompted continued migration from the rural countryside to the growing cities. Many migrant farmers found work in Thailand's growing manufacturing industry, and took jobs in sweatshops and factories with few labour regulations and often exploitative conditions.

Those that could not find formal factory work, including illegal migrants and the families of rural Thai migrants that followed their relatives to the urban centres, turned to the informal sector to provide the extra support needed for survival—under the widespread regulation imposed by the structural adjustment programs, one family member working in a factory or sweatshop made very little. Scholars argue that the economic consequences and social costs of Thailand's labour reforms in the wake of the 1997 Asian Financial Crisis fell on individuals and families rather than the state. This can be described as the "externalisation of market risk", meaning that as the country's labour market became increasingly deregulated, the burden and responsibility of providing an adequate livelihood shifted from employers and the state to the workers themselves, whose families had to find jobs in the informal sector to make up for the losses and subsidise the wages being made by their relatives in the formal sector. The weight of these economic changes hit migrants and the urban poor especially hard, and the informal sector expanded rapidly as a result.

Today, informal labour in Thailand is typically broken down into three main groups: subcontracted/self employed/home-based workers, service workers (including those that are employed in restaurants, as street vendors, masseuses, taxi drivers, and as domestic workers), and agricultural workers. Not included in these categories are those that work in entertainment, nightlife, and the sex industry. Individuals employed in these facets of the informal labour sector face additional vulnerabilities, including recruitment into circles of sexual exploitation and human trafficking.

In general, education levels are low in the informal sector. A 2012 study found that 64% of informal workers had not completed education beyond primary school. Many informal workers are also migrants, only some of which have legal status in the country. Education and citizenship are two main barriers to entry for those looking to work in formal industries, and enjoy the labour protections and social security benefits that come along with formal employment. Because the informal labour sector is not recognised under the Labour Protection Act (LPA), informal workers are much more vulnerable to exploitation and unsafe working conditions than those employed in more formal and federally recognised industries. While some Thai labour laws provide minimal protections to domestic and agricultural workers, they are often weak and difficult to enforce. Furthermore, Thai social security policies fail to protect against the risks many informal workers face, including workplace accidents and compensation as well as unemployment and retirement insurance. Many informal workers are not legally contracted for their employment, and many do not make a living wage. Tens of thousands of migrants from neighboring countries face exploitation in a few industries, especially in fishing where slave-like conditions have been reported.

Science and technology 
Thailand ranked 43rd in the Global Innovation Index in 2021. The Ministry of Higher Education, Science, Research and Innovation and its agencies oversees the development of science, technology, and research in Thailand. According to the National Research Council of Thailand, the country devoted 1.1% of its GDP to the research and development of science in 2019, with over 166,788 research and development personnel in full-time equivalent that year.

Infrastructure

Transportation 

The State Railway of Thailand (SRT) operates all of Thailand's national rail lines. Bangkok Railway Station (Hua Lamphong Station) is the main terminus of all routes. Phahonyothin and ICD Lat Krabang are the main freight terminals.  SRT had  of track, all of it meter gauge except the Airport Link. Nearly all is single-track (4,097 km), although some important sections around Bangkok are double or triple-tracked and there are plans to extend this. Rail transport in Bangkok includes long-distance services, and some daily commuter trains running from and to the outskirts of the city during the rush hour, but passenger numbers have remained low. There are also three rapid transit rail systems in the capital.

Thailand has  of highways. , Thailand has over 462,133 roads and 37 million registered vehicles, 20 million of them motorbikes. A number of undivided two-lane highways have been converted into divided four-lane highways. There are 4,125 public vans operating on 114 routes from Bangkok alone. Other forms of road transport includes tuk-tuks, taxis—with over 80,647 registered taxis nationwide as of 2018—vans (minibus), motorbike taxis and songthaews.

, Thailand has 103 airports with 63 paved runways, in addition to 6 heliports. The busiest airport in the country is Bangkok's Suvarnabhumi Airport.

Energy 

75% of Thailand's electrical generation is powered by natural gas in 2014. Coal-fired power plants produce an additional 20% of electricity, with the remainder coming from biomass, hydro, and biogas.

Thailand produces roughly one-third of the oil it consumes. It is the second largest importer of oil in SE Asia. Thailand is a large producer of natural gas, with reserves of at least 10 trillion cubic feet. After Indonesia, it is the largest coal producer in SE Asia, but must import additional coal to meet domestic demand.

Demographics 

 
Thailand had a population of 69,799,978 as of 2020. Thailand's population is largely rural, concentrated in the rice-growing areas of the central, northeastern and northern regions. About 45.7% of Thailand's population lived in urban areas , concentrated mostly in and around the Bangkok Metropolitan Area.

Thailand's government-sponsored family planning program resulted in a dramatic decline in population growth from 3.1% in 1960 to around 0.4% today. In 1970, an average of 5.7 people lived in a Thai household. At the time of the 2010 census, the average Thai household size was 3.2 people.

Ethnic groups 

Thai nationals make up the majority of Thailand's population, 95.9% in 2010. The remaining 4.1% of the population are Burmese (2.0%), others 1.3%, and unspecified 0.9%.

According to the Royal Thai Government's 2011 Country Report to the UN Committee responsible for the International Convention for the Elimination of All Forms of Racial Discrimination, available from the Department of Rights and Liberties Promotion of the Thai Ministry of Justice, 62 ethnic communities are officially recognised in Thailand. Twenty million Central Thai (together with approximately 650,000 Khorat Thai) make up approximately 20,650,000 (34.1 percent) of the nation's population of 60,544,937 at the time of completion of the Mahidol University Ethnolinguistic Maps of Thailand data (1997).

The 2011 Thailand Country Report provides population numbers for mountain peoples ('hill tribes') and ethnic communities in the Northeast and is explicit about its main reliance on the Mahidol University Ethnolinguistic Maps of Thailand data. Thus, though over 3.288 million people in the Northeast alone could not be categorised, the population and percentages of other ethnic communities circa 1997 are known for all of Thailand and constitute minimum populations. In descending order, the largest (equal to or greater than 400,000) are a) 15,080,000 Lao (24.9 percent) consisting of the Thai Lao (14 million) and other smaller Lao groups, namely the Thai Loei (400–500,000), Lao Lom (350,000), Lao Wiang/Klang (200,000), Lao Khrang (90,000), Lao Ngaew (30,000), and Lao Ti (10,000); b) six million Khon Muang (9.9 percent, also called Northern Thais); c) 4.5 million Pak Tai (7.5 percent, also called Southern Thais); d) 1.4 million Khmer Leu (2.3 percent, also called Northern Khmer); e) 900,000 Malay (1.5%); f) 500,000 Nyaw (0.8 percent); g) 470,000 Phu Thai (0.8 percent); h) 400,000 Kuy/Kuay (also known as Suay) (0.7 percent), and i) 350,000 Karen (0.6 percent). Thai Chinese, those of significant Chinese heritage, are 14% of the population, while Thais with partial Chinese ancestry comprise up to 40% of the population. Thai Malays represent 3% of the population, with the remainder consisting of Mons, Khmers and various "hill tribes". The country's official language is Thai and the primary religion is Theravada Buddhism, which is practised by around 95% of the population.

Increasing numbers of migrants from neighbouring Myanmar, Laos, and Cambodia, as well as from Nepal and India, have pushed the total number of non-national residents to around 3.5 million , up from an estimated 2 million in 2008, and about 1.3 million in 2000. Some 41,000 Britons and 20,000 Australians live in Thailand.

Population centres

Language 

The official language of Thailand is Thai, a Kra–Dai language closely related to Lao, Shan in Myanmar, and numerous smaller languages spoken in an arc from Hainan and Yunnan south to the Chinese border. It is the principal language of education and government and spoken throughout the country. The standard is based on the dialect of the central Thai people, and it is written in the Thai alphabet, an abugida script that evolved from the Khmer alphabet.

Sixty-two languages were recognised by the Royal Thai Government. For the purposes of the national census, four dialects of Thai exist; these partly coincide with regional designations, such as Southern Thai and Northern Thai.

The largest of Thailand's minority languages is the Lao dialect of Isan spoken in the northeastern provinces. Although sometimes considered a Thai dialect, it is a Lao dialect, and the region where it is traditionally spoken was historically part of the Lao kingdom of Lan Xang. In the far south, Kelantan-Pattani Malay is the primary language of Malay Muslims. Varieties of Chinese are also spoken by the large Thai Chinese population, with the Teochew dialect best-represented.

Numerous tribal languages are also spoken, including many Austroasiatic languages such as Mon, Khmer, Viet, Mlabri and Aslian; Austronesian languages such as Cham, Moken and Urak Lawoi'; Sino-Tibetan languages like Lawa, Akha, and Karen; and other Tai languages such as Tai Yo, Phu Thai, and Saek. Hmong is a member of the Hmong–Mien languages, which is now regarded as a language family of its own.

Religion 

The country's most prevalent religion is Theravada Buddhism, which is an integral part of Thai identity and culture. Active participation in Buddhism is among the highest in the world. Thailand has the second-largest number of Buddhists in the world after China. According to the 2000 census, 94.6% and 93.58% in 2010 of the country's population self-identified as Buddhists of the Theravada tradition.

Muslims constitute the second largest religious group in Thailand, comprising 5.4% of the population in 2018. Islam is concentrated mostly in the country's southernmost provinces: Pattani, Yala, Satun, Narathiwat, and part of Songkhla Chumphon, which are predominantly Malay, most of whom are Sunni Muslims. Christians represented 1.13% (2018) of the population in 2018, with the remaining population consisting of Hindus and Sikhs, who live mostly in the country's cities. There is also a small but historically significant Jewish community in Thailand dating back to the 17th century.

The constitution does not name official state religion, and provides for freedom of religion. Even the authority formally does not register new religious groups that have not been accepted and limit the number of missionaries, unregistered religious organisations as well as missionaries who are allowed to operate freely. There have been no widespread reports of societal abuses or discrimination based on religious belief or practice. Thai law officially recognizes five religious groups: Buddhists, Muslims, Brahmin-Hindus, Sikhs, and Christians. However, some laws are inspired from Buddhist practices, such as banning alcohol sales on religious holidays.

Education 

Thailand's youth literacy rate was 98.1% in 2015. Education is provided by a well-organised school system of kindergartens, primary, lower secondary and upper secondary schools, numerous vocational colleges, and universities. Education is compulsory up to and including age 14, while the government is mandated to provide free education through to age 17. The establishment of reliable and coherent curricula for its primary and secondary schools is subject to rapid changes. Issues concerning university entrance has been in constant upheaval for a number of years. The country is also one of the few that still mandates uniform up to the university years, which is still a subject of ongoing debate. The quality of providing education in the country is often questioned.

In 2013, the Ministry of Information and Communication Technology announced that 27,231 schools would receive classroom-level access to high-speed internet. However, the country's educational infrastructure was still underprepared for online teaching, as smaller and more remote schools were particularly hindered by COVID-19 restrictions.

The number of higher education institutions in Thailand has grown strongly over the past decades to 156 officially. The two top-ranking universities in Thailand are Chulalongkorn University and Mahidol University. Thai universities' research output is still relatively low, even though the country's journal publications increased by 20% between 2011 and 2016. Recent initiatives, such as the National Research University and Graduate research intensive university: VISTEC, are designed to strengthen Thailand's national research universities.

The private sector of education is well developed and significantly contributes to the overall provision of education. Thailand has the second highest number of English-medium private international schools in Southeast Asian Nations. Cram schools are especially popular for university entrance exams.

Students in ethnic minority areas score consistently lower in standardised national and international tests.
This is likely due to unequal allocation of educational resources, weak teacher training, poverty, and low Thai language skill, the language of the tests. , Thailand was ranked 89th out of 100 countries globally for English proficiency.

Extensive nationwide IQ tests were administered to 72,780 Thai students from December 2010 to January 2011. The average IQ was found to be 98.59, which is higher than previous studies have found. IQ levels were found to be inconsistent throughout the country, with the lowest average of 88.07 found in Narathiwat Province and the highest average of 108.91 reported in Nonthaburi Province. The Ministry of Public Health blamed the discrepancies on iodine deficiency, and required that iodine be added to table salt.

Thailand is the third most popular study destination in ASEAN. The number of international degree students in Thailand increased by 9.7 times between 1999 and 2012, from 1,882 to 20,309 students. Most of international students come from neighbor countries like China, Myanmar, Cambodia and Vietnam.

Health 

Thailand ranks world's sixth, and Asia's first in the 2019 Global Health Security Index of global health security capabilities in 195 countries, making it the only developing country on the world's top ten. Thailand had 62 hospitals accredited by Joint Commission International. In 2002, Bumrungrad became the first hospital in Asia to meet the standard.

Health and medical care is overseen by the Ministry of Public Health (MOPH), along with several other non-ministerial government agencies, with total national expenditures on health amounting to 4.3 percent of GDP in 2009. Non-communicable diseases form the major burden of morbidity and mortality, while infectious diseases including malaria and tuberculosis, as well as traffic accidents, are also important public health issues. The current Minister for Public Health is Anutin Charnvirakul.

In December 2018 the interim parliament voted to legalise the use of cannabis for medical reasons, making Thailand the first Southeast Asian country to allow the use of medical cannabis.

Culture 

Thai culture and traditions incorporate a great deal of influence from India, China, Cambodia, and the rest of Southeast Asia. Thailand's national religion, Theravada Buddhism, is central to modern Thai identity. Thai Buddhism has evolved over time to include many regional beliefs originating from Hinduism, animism, as well as ancestor worship. The official calendar in Thailand is based on the Eastern version of the Buddhist Era (BE). Thai identity today is a social construct of the Phibun regime in the 1940s.

Several ethnic groups mediated change between their traditional local culture, national Thai, and global cultural influences. Overseas Chinese also form a significant part of Thai society, particularly in and around Bangkok. Their successful integration into Thai society has allowed them to hold positions of economic and political power. Thai Chinese businesses prosper as part of the larger bamboo network.

Respect for elderly and superiors (by age, position, monks, or certain professions) is Thai mores. As with other Asian cultures, respect towards ancestors is an essential part of Thai spiritual practice. Thais have a strong sense of social hierarchy, reflecting in many classes of honorifics. Elders have by tradition ruled in family decisions or ceremonies. Wai is a traditional Thai greeting, and is generally offered first by a person who is younger or lower in social status and position. Older siblings have duties to younger ones. Thais have a strong sense of hospitality and generosity.

Taboos in Thai culture include touching someone's head or pointing with the feet, as the head is considered the most sacred and the foot the lowest part of the body.

Art 

The origins of Thai art were very much influenced by Buddhist art and by scenes from the Indian epics. Traditional Thai sculpture almost exclusively depicts images of the Buddha, being very similar with the other styles from Southeast Asia. Traditional Thai paintings usually consist of book illustrations, and painted ornamentation of buildings such as palaces and temples. Thai art was influenced by indigenous civilisations of the Mon and other civilisations. By the Sukothai and Ayutthaya period, Thai had developed into its own unique style and was later further influenced by the other Asian styles, mostly by Sri Lankan and Chinese. Thai sculpture and painting, and the royal courts provided patronage, erecting temples and other religious shrines as acts of merit or to commemorate important events.

Traditional Thai paintings showed subjects in two dimensions without perspective. The size of each element in the picture reflected its degree of importance. The primary technique of composition is that of apportioning areas: the main elements are isolated from each other by space transformers. This eliminated the intermediate ground, which would otherwise imply perspective. Perspective was introduced only as a result of Western influence in the mid-19th century. Monk artist Khrua In Khong is well known as the first artist to introduce linear perspective to Thai traditional art.

The most frequent narrative subjects for paintings were or are: the Jataka stories, episodes from the life of the Buddha, the Buddhist heavens and hells, themes derived from the Thai versions of the Ramayana and Mahabharata, not to mention scenes of daily life. Some of the scenes are influenced by Thai folklore instead of following strict Buddhist iconography.

Architecture 

Architecture is the preeminent medium of the country's cultural legacy and reflects both the challenges of living in Thailand's sometimes extreme climate as well as, historically, the importance of architecture to the Thai people's sense of community and religious beliefs. Influenced by the architectural traditions of many of Thailand's neighbours, it has also developed significant regional variation within its vernacular and religious buildings.

The Ayutthaya Kingdom movement, which went from approximately 1350 to 1767, was one of the most fruitful and creative periods in Thai architecture. The identity of architecture in Ayutthaya period is designed to display might and riches so it has great size and appearance. The temples in Ayutthaya seldom built eaves stretching from the masterhead. The dominant feature of this style is sunlight shining into buildings. During the latter part of the Ayutthaya period, architecture was regarded as a peak achievement that responded to the requirements of people and expressed the gracefulness of Thainess.

Buddhist temples in Thailand are known as "wats", from the Pāḷi vāṭa, meaning an enclosure. A temple has an enclosing wall that divides it from the secular world. Wat architecture has seen many changes in Thailand in the course of history. Although there are many differences in layout and style, they all adhere to the same principles.

Literature 

Thai literature has had a long history. Even before the establishment of the Sukhothai Kingdom there existed oral and written works.

During the Sukhothai Kingdom, Most literary works were written in simple prose with certain alliteration schemes. Major works include King Ram Khamhaeng Inscription describing life at the time, which is considered the first literary work in Thai script, but some historians questioned its authenticity. Trai Phum Phra Ruang, written in 1345 by King Maha Thammaracha I, expounds Buddhist philosophy based on a profound and extensive study with reference to over 30 sacred texts and could be considered the nation's first piece of research dissertation.

During the Ayutthaya Kingdom, new poetic forms were created, with different rhyme schemes and metres. It is common to find a combination of different poetic forms in one poetic work. Lilit Yuan Phai is a narrative poem describing the war between King Borommatrailokkanat of Ayutthaya and Prince Tilokkarat of Lan Na. One of the most beautiful literary works is Kap He Ruea composed by Prince Thammathibet in the nirat tradition. Traditionally, the verse is sung during the colourful royal barge procession and has been the model for subsequent poets to emulate. The same prince also composed the greatly admired Kap Ho Khlong on the Visit to Than Thongdaeng and Kap Ho Khlong Nirat Phrabat. Despite its short period of 15 years, Thon Buri Period produced Ramakian, a verse drama contributed by King Taksin the Great. The era marked the revival of literature after the fall of Ayutthaya.

During the 18th century Rattanakosin period, which still fought with the Burmese, many of the early Rattanakosin works deal with war and military strategy. Some examples are Nirat Rop Phama Thi Tha Din Daeng, Phleng Yao Rop Phama Thi Nakhon Si Thammarat. In the performing arts, perhaps the most important dramatic achievement is the complete work of Ramakian by King Rama I. In addition, There were also verse recitals with musical accompaniment, such as Mahori telling the story of Kaki, Sepha relating the story of Khun Chang Khun Phaen. Other recitals include Sri Thanonchai. The most important Thai poet in this period was Sunthorn Phu (สุนทรภู่) (1786–1855), widely known as "the bard of Rattanakosin". Sunthorn Phu is best known for his epic poem Phra Aphai Mani, written during 1822 and 1844.

Some of the most well-known modern Thai writers include Kukrit Pramoj, Kulap Saipradit, (penname Siburapha), Suweeriya Sirisingh (penname Botan), Chart Korbjitti, Prabda Yoon and Duanwad Pimwana. The works tended to be light fiction.

Music and dance 

Aside from folk and regional dances (southern Thailand's Menora (dance) and Ramwong, for example), the two major forms of Thai classical dance drama are Khon and Lakhon nai. In the beginning, both were exclusively court entertainments and it was not until much later that a popular style of dance theatre, likay, evolved as a diversion for common folk who had no access to royal performances.

Folk dance forms include dance theater forms like likay, numerous regional dances (ram), the ritual dance ram muay, and homage to the teacher, wai khru. Both ram muay and wai khru take place before all traditional muay Thai matches. The wai is also an annual ceremony performed by Thai classical dance groups to honor their artistic ancestors.

Thai classical music is synonymous with those stylized court ensembles and repertoires that emerged in their present form within the royal centers of Central Thailand some 800 years ago. These ensembles, while being influenced by older practices are today uniquely Thai expressions. While the three primary classical ensembles, the Piphat, Khrueang sai and Mahori differ in significant ways, they all share a basic instrumentation and theoretical approach. Each employs small ching hand cymbals and krap wooden sticks to mark the primary beat reference. Thai classical music has had a wide influence on the musical traditions of neighboring countries. The traditional music of Myanmar was strongly influenced by the Thai music repertoire, called Yodaya (ယိုးဒယား), which was brought over from the Ayutthaya Kingdom. As Siam expanded its political and cultural influence to Laos and Cambodia during the early Rattanakosin period, its music was quickly absorbed by the Cambodia and Lao courts.

Entertainment 

Thai films are exported and exhibited in Southeast Asia. Thai cinema has developed its own unique identity and now being internationally recognized for their culture-driven. Films such as Ong-Bak: Muay Thai Warrior (2003) and Tom-Yum-Goong (2005), starring Tony Jaa, feature distinctive aspects of Thai martial arts "Muay Thai".

Thai horror has always had a significant cult following, with a unique take on tales from beyond the grave. More recently, horror films such as Shutter (2004), was one of the best-known Thai horror movies and recognized worldwide. Other examples include The Unseeable (2006), Alone (2007), Body (2007), Coming Soon (2008), 4bia (2008), Phobia 2 (2009), Ladda Land (2011), Pee Mak (2013), The Promise (2017), and The Medium (2021).

The Thai heist thriller film Bad Genius (2017) was one of the most internationally successful Thai films; it broke Thai film earning records in several Asian countries, Bad Genius won in 12 categories at the 27th Suphannahong National Film Awards, and also won the Jury Award at the 16th New York Asian Film Festival with a worldwide collection of more than $42 million.

Thailand television dramas, known as Lakorn, have become popular in Thailand and its neighbours. Many dramas tend to have a romantic focus, such as Khluen Chiwit, U-Prince, Ugly Duckling, The Crown Princess and teen dramas television series, such as 2gether: The Series, The Gifted, Girl From Nowhere, Hormones: The Series.

The Entertainment industries (film and television) are estimated to have directly contributed $2.1 billion in gross domestic product (GDP) to the Thai economy in 2011. They also directly supported 86,600 jobs. Amongst several Dance-pop artists who have made internationally successful can be mentioned "Lisa" Lalisa Manoban and Tata Young.

Cuisine 

Thai cuisine is one of the most popular in the world. Thai food blends five fundamental tastes: sweet, spicy, sour, bitter, and salty. The herbs and spices most used in Thai cooking themselves have medicinal qualities such as garlic, lemongrass, kaffir lime, galangal, turmeric, coriander, and coconut milk. Each region of Thailand has its specialities: kaeng khiao wan (green curry) in the central region, som tam (green papaya salad) in the northeast, khao soi in the north, and massaman curry in the south.

In 2017, seven Thai dishes appeared on a list of the "World's 50 Best Foods"— an online worldwide poll by CNN Travel. Thailand had more dishes on the list than any other country. They were: tom yam goong (4th), pad Thai (5th), som tam (6th), massaman curry (10th), green curry (19th), Thai fried rice (24th) and mu nam tok (36th). Two desserts were also listed in CNN’s 50 Best Desserts Around The World: mango sticky rice and tub tim krob.

The staple food in Thailand is rice, particularly jasmine rice (also known as hom Mali) which forms part of almost every meal. Thailand is a leading exporter of rice, and Thais consume over 100 kg of milled rice per person per year. Thailand is also the world leader in edible insect industry and well-known for its street food; Bangkok is sometimes called the street food capital of the world.

Units of measurement 

Thailand generally uses the metric system, but traditional units of measurement for land area are used, and imperial units of measurement are occasionally used for building materials, such as wood and plumbing fixtures. Years are numbered as B.E. (Buddhist Era) in educational settings, civil service, government, contracts, and newspaper datelines. However, in banking, and increasingly in industry and commerce, standard Western year (Christian or Common Era) counting is the standard practice.

Sports 

Muay Thai (RTGS: Muai Thai, lit. "Thai boxing") is a combat sport of Thailand that uses stand-up striking along with various clinching techniques. Muay Thai became widespread internationally in the late-20th to 21st century, when Westernized practitioners from Thailand began competing in kickboxing and mixed rules matches as well as matches under muay Thai rules around the world.  Famous practitioners include Buakaw Banchamek, Samart Payakaroon, Dieselnoi Chor Thanasukarn and Apidej Sit-Hirun. Buakaw Banchamek has probably brought more international interest in Muay Thai than any other Muay Thai fighters ever had.

Association football has overtaken muay Thai as the most widely followed sport in contemporary Thai society. Thailand national football team has played the AFC Asian Cup six times and reached the semifinals in 1972. The country has hosted the Asian Cup twice, in 1972 and in 2007. The 2007 edition was co-hosted together with Indonesia, Malaysia and Vietnam. It is not uncommon to see Thais cheering their favourite English Premier League teams on television and walking around in replica kit. Another widely enjoyed pastime, and once a competitive sport, is kite flying.

Volleyball is rapidly growing as one of the most popular sports. The women's team has often participated in the World Championship, World Cup, and World Grand Prix Asian Championship. They have won the Asian Championship twice and Asian Cup once. By the success of the women's team, the men's team has been growing as well.

Takraw (Thai: ตะกร้อ) is a sport native to Thailand, in which the players hit a rattan ball and are only allowed to use their feet, knees, chest, and head to touch the ball. Sepak takraw is a form of this sport which is similar to volleyball. The players must volley a ball over a net and force it to hit the ground on the opponent's side. It is also a popular sport in other countries in Southeast Asia. A rather similar game but played only with the feet is buka ball.

Snooker has enjoyed increasing popularity in Thailand in recent years, with interest in the game being stimulated by the success of Thai snooker player James Wattana in the 1990s. Other notable players produced by the country include Ratchayothin Yotharuck, Noppon Saengkham and Dechawat Poomjaeng.

Rugby is also a growing sport in Thailand with the Thailand national rugby union team rising to be ranked 61st in the world. Thailand became the first country in the world to host an international 80 welterweight rugby tournament in 2005. The national domestic Thailand Rugby Union (TRU) competition includes several universities and services teams such as Chulalongkorn University, Mahasarakham University, Kasetsart University, Prince of Songkla University, Thammasat University, Rangsit University, the Thai Police, the Thai Army, the Thai Navy and the Royal Thai Air Force. Local sports clubs which also compete in the TRU include the British Club of Bangkok, the Southerners Sports Club (Bangkok) and the Royal Bangkok Sports Club.

Thailand has been called the golf capital of Asia as it is a popular destination for golf. The country attracts a large number of golfers from Japan, Korea, Singapore, South Africa, and Western countries who come to play golf in Thailand every year. The growing popularity of golf, especially among the middle classes and immigrants, is evident as there are more than 200 world-class golf courses nationwide, and some of them are chosen to host PGA and LPGA tournaments, such as Amata Spring Country Club, Alpine Golf and Sports Club, Thai Country Club, and Black Mountain Golf Club.

Basketball is a growing sport in Thailand, especially on the professional sports club level. The Chang Thailand Slammers won the 2011 ASEAN Basketball League Championship. The Thailand national basketball team had its most successful year at the 1966 Asian Games where it won the silver medal.

Other sports in Thailand are slowly growing as the country develops its sporting infrastructure. The success in sports like weightlifting and taekwondo at the last two summer Olympic Games has demonstrated that boxing is no longer the only medal option for Thailand.

The well-known Lumpinee Boxing Stadium originally sited at Rama IV Road near Lumphini Park hosted its final Muay Thai boxing matches on 8 February 2014 after the venue first opened in December 1956. Managed by the Royal Thai Army, the stadium was officially selected for the purpose of muay Thai bouts following a competition that was staged on 15 March 1956. From 11 February 2014, the stadium will relocate to Ram Intra Road, due to the new venue's capacity to accommodate audiences of up to 3,500. Foreigners typically pay between 1,000 and 2,000 baht to view a match, with prices depending on the location of the seating.

Thammasat Stadium is a multi-purpose stadium in Bangkok. It is currently used mostly for football matches. The stadium holds 25,000. It is on Thammasat University's Rangsit campus. It was built for the 1998 Asian Games by construction firm Christiani and Nielsen, the same company that constructed the Democracy Monument in Bangkok.

Rajamangala National Stadium is the biggest sporting arena in Thailand. It currently has a capacity of 65,000. It is in Bang Kapi, Bangkok. The stadium was built in 1998 for the 1998 Asian Games and is the home stadium of the Thailand national football team.

See also 

 International rankings of Thailand
 Outline of Thailand

Notes

References

Further reading 
 Chachavalpongpun, Pavin, ed. Routledge Handbook Of Contemporary Thailand (2020)
 Cooper, Robert. Culture Shock! Thailand: A Survival Guide to Customs and Etiquette (2008)
 London, Ellen. Thailand Condensed: 2000 Years of History & Culture (2008)
 Lonely Planet's Best of Thailand (2020)
 Mishra, Patit Paban. The History of Thailand (Greenwood, 2010)
 Moore, Frank J. ed. Thailand: Its People, Its Society, Its Culture (HRAF Press, 1974).
 Wyatt, David K. Thailand: A Short History (Yale University Press, 2003)
 Zawacki, Benjamin. Thailand: Shifting ground between the US and a rising China (2nd ed. . Bloomsbury, 2021).

External links 

 Government
 Thaigov.go.th – Government of Thailand
 Chief of State and Cabinet Members
 Mfa.go.th – Ministry of Foreign Affairs
 Thailand Internet information – National Electronics and Computer Technology Center
 Ministry of Culture

 General information

 Thailand. The World Factbook. Central Intelligence Agency.
 Thailand entry in Library of Congress Country Studies. 1987
 Thailand from UCB Libraries GovPubs
 
 Thailand from the BBC News
 Thailand Encyclopædia Britannica entry
 
 Longdo Map – Thailand maps in English and Thai
 Key Development Forecasts for Thailand from International Futures
 2010 Thailand population census by Economic and Social statistics Bureau

 Travel
 Tourism Authority of Thailand – official tourism website

 Other
 Thailand Country Fact Sheet from the Common Language Project
 

 
1932 establishments in Asia
1932 establishments in Siam
1932 establishments in Southeast Asia
Countries in Asia
Kingdoms
Member states of ASEAN
Member states of the United Nations
Newly industrializing countries
Observer states of the Organisation of Islamic Cooperation
Southeast Asian countries
States and territories established in 1932